Raid, RAID or Raids may refer to:

Attack
 Raid (military), a sudden attack behind the enemy's lines without the intention of holding ground
 Corporate raid, a type of hostile takeover in business
 Panty raid, a prankish raid by male college students on the living quarters of female students to steal panties as trophies
 Police raid, a police action involving the entering of a house with the intent to capture personnel or evidence, often taking place early in the morning
Union raid, when an outsider trade union takes over the membership of an existing union

Arts, entertainment, and media

Films
 Raid (1947 film), an East German film
 Raid (2003 film), a 2003 Finnish film
 Raid (2018 film), an Indian period crime thriller

Gaming
 Raid (gaming), a type of mission in a video game where a large number of people combine forces to defeat a powerful enemy
 Raid (video game), a Nintendo Entertainment System title released by Sachen in 1989
 Raid over Moscow, a 1984 computer game re-released as Raid
 Raid: World War II, a 2017 computer game
 Raid: Shadow Legends, a 2018 mobile game
 Raid, in context of Twitch or other live streaming services, bringing a group of viewers to a target channel

Other uses in arts, entertainment, and media
 Raid (band), a Tennessee-based band, who helped pioneer the Vegan straight edge movement
 "Raid", a song by Lakeside on the album Untouchables
 R.A.I.D., a branch of the fictional Marvel Comics terrorist group Advanced Idea Mechanics

Sports
 Raid (boating), a leisure pursuit combining sailing and rowing
 Rally raid, a form of off-road motorsport
 Rebreather Association of International Divers, a dive training organization

People
Johan Raid (1885–1964), Estonian politician and government minister
Kaarin Raid (1942–2014), Estonian director, theatre pedagogue and actor
Kaljo Raid (1921–2005), Estonian composer

Other uses
 RAID (French Police unit), an anti-terrorist unit of the French National Police
 Raid (insecticide), a consumer insecticide marketed by S. C. Johnson & Son
 Real-Time Adversarial Intelligence & Decision-making "RAID", a DARPA project to perform predictive analysis of enemy behavior
 RAID (in mental health), Reinforce Appropriate, Implode Disruptive, is a positive psychology least restrictive practice approach for working with people who exhibit challenging behavior
 Redundant array of independent disks (RAID), a data storage mechanism for improving performance and fault tolerance in computing systems
 Raids, Manche, France
 Risks, Assumptions, Issues and Dependencies, a project management technique called "RAID log"

See also
 Raed, a given name (including a list of people with the name)
 Raider (disambiguation)
 Raiding (disambiguation)
 The Raid (disambiguation)

Estonian-language surnames